Mona Hatoum (born 1952) is a British-Palestinian multimedia and installation artist who lives in London.

Biography
Mona Hatoum was born in 1952 in Beirut, Lebanon, to Palestinian parents. Although born in Lebanon, Hatoum was ineligible for a Lebanese identity card and does not identify as Lebanese. As she grew up, her family did not support her desire to pursue art. She continued to draw throughout her childhood, though, illustrating her work from poetry and science classes.

Hatoum studied graphic design at Beirut University College in Lebanon for two years and then began working at an advertising agency. Hatoum was displeased with the advertising work she produced. During a visit to London in 1975, the Lebanese Civil War broke out and Hatoum was forced into exile.

She stayed in London, training at both the Byam Shaw School of Art and the Slade School of Fine Art (University College, London) between the years 1975 and 1981. In the years since, "she has traveled extensively and developed a dynamic art practice that explores human struggles related to political conflict, global inequity, and being an outsider."

Artwork and themes
Hatoum explores a variety of different subject matter via different theoretical frameworks. Her work can be interpreted as a description of the body, as a commentary on politics, and on gender and difference as she explores the dangers and confines of the domestic world. Her work can also be interpreted through the concept of space as her sculpture and installation work depend on the viewer to inhabit the surrounding space to complete the effect. There are always multiple readings to her work. The physical responses that Hatoum desired to provoke psychological and emotional responses ensures unique and individual reactions from different viewers.

Early work
Hatoum's early work consisted largely of performance pieces that used a direct physical confrontation with an audience to make a political point. She used this technique as a means of making a direct statement using her own body; the performances often referenced her background and the political situation in Palestine. In her work, she addressed the vulnerability of the individual in relation to the violence inherent in institutional power structures. Her primary point of reference was the human body, sometimes using her own body.

Measures of Distance
Created in 1988, Measures of Distance illustrates Hatoum's early themes of family, displacement, and female sexuality. The video piece itself is fifteen minutes long and consists of intimate, colored photographs of Hatoum's mother showering. Hatoum overlays the photographs with letters that her mother, living in Beirut during the civil war, wrote to Hatoum, living in London. Handwritten in Arabic, the letters make up the video's narration and themes, and speak to the difficulty of sending letters in a time of conflict. Hatoum reads the letters aloud in Arabic and English. The video roots itself in the brief family reunion that occurred in Beirut between Hatoum and her parents in 1981. While primarily about the mother–daughter relationship, in her mother's letters Hatoum's father is mentioned and thus the father–daughter relationship as well as the husband–wife relationship is examined in this video.

The elements of the video—the letters, Hatoum's mother's wish to see her, and mentions of the war by Hatoum's mother—explore how the war in Palestine and the war in Lebanon displaced the identity and the relationships of Hatoum and her family. The video is neither a documentary nor meant to be journalistic. The video critiques stereotypes and remains optimistic, since the narration from the letters is largely positive, except about the distance between the mother and the daughter. Hatoum attempts to recreate the moments when she reunited with her mother in Beirut and when she asked to photograph her in the shower. Instead of directly depicting the Israeli–Palestinian conflict or the Lebanese Civil War, Hatoum shows how the conflicts affected her family's relationships and her identity. Hatoum both distances and draws in Western audiences through her narration in English and Arabic.

In this portrait of a Palestinian woman, Hatoum gives her mother a voice while subverting stereotypes about Arab women. The Tate Modern describes the portrait in the following words: "It is through the daughter's art-making project that the mother is able to present herself freely, in a form which cements a bond of identity independent of colonial and patriarchal concerns." Measures of Distance is one of the few works done by Hatoum that speaks directly to her background. In other works, Hatoum prefers to be more abstract and to leave the work open ended. While not as abstract as many of her other works, the viewer is still forced to work through how to understand the formal elements of the video. They are not easily given by Hatoum, as the narration is here. "The video transmits the 'paradoxical state of geographical distance and emotional closeness.'"

Measures of Distance was screened at the London Film Festival, AFI National Video Festival, and the Montreal Women's Film and Video Festival.

Grater Divide 
Made in 2002, Grater Divide transforms an everyday object, in this case a common kitchen grater, into a  divider, alluding to political alienation, perhaps caused by Israeli-built walls in Palestinian territory.

Hot Spot III
Hot Spot III, created in 2009, is a large installation piece of the globe tilted like the Earth and about as tall as a person. The title connects to the theme of political unrest, imagining conflict in one geographical area upsetting the whole world. The globe is made of cage-like steel that glows luminescent red, as though the world is ablaze, flickering quickly, meant to create an energetic environment that mesmerizes the audience. The installation also invokes a feeling of danger with the hot red lighting outlining the continents. Hatoum challenges whether minimalist or surrealist forms can adequately address the world's issues.

Later work

In the late 1980s, Hatoum abandoned performances as politically too direct and instead turned her attention to installations and objects, taking up some of the earlier ideas from her student days at the Slade School of Art in London. From then on, she relied on the kind of interactivity that lets the spectator become involved in the aesthetic experience without making the artist as performer the focus of attention.

Since the 1990s, her work has generally shifted from making statements to asking questions. Much more is required of the viewer as performances were replaced by sculptures and installations that required a level of mental and physical interactivity. Her practice has shifted towards site specificity in, for instance, Institute of Contemporary Art, Boston, and Kunsthalle Hamburg.

A notable piece exemplifying her turn from performance to physical objects is Keffieh (1993–1999), a scarf woven of human hair that juxtaposes ideas of femininity and religion.

At the end of the 1980s, she began to focus on common domestic objects—including kitchen utensils and house furnishings. T42 (1993–98) is a pair of teacups fused together at the rim.

The body
Many of Hatoum's early pieces situate the body as the locus of a network of concerns—political, feminist, and linguistic—thereby eliciting a highly visceral response. One of her pieces, a 1994 video installation called Corps etranger, showed color video images of an endoscopic probe of her body. Corps etranger was originally produced for Centre Georges Pompidou and features a partially enclosed, cylindrical structure that viewers are called to enter. The viewer stands on a circular plate of glass, and video close-up images of internal and external parts of the artist's body. The artist hails the viewer to "walk around" the inside of her body through the visual sequence taken on the endoscope and colonoscope, scanning and probing her digestive system. The audio is a recording of a heartbeat and bodily movements.

The artwork of Hatoum investigates the concept of the 'abjection' introduced by the cultural theorist, Julia Kristeva and the uncanny in her works using body hair.

Politics
The political possibilities for the uncanny visual motif are relevant to discussions of Hatoum's work, as the disruption achieved at a psychological level can have broad implications involving power, politics, or individual concerns. The allusiveness attained by her work is not always referencing grand political events, or appealing to a generalized cultural consciousness, but instead to a seemingly unattainable threat that is only possible to address on an individual scale.

Hatoum has tied her works to other political movements, especially black struggle. In an interview with Michael Archer in 1997, Hatoum said: "At the beginning it was important to think about the black struggle as a total political struggle. There are common political forces and attitudes that discriminate against people. In the same way as feminism started off with this totalizing concept of 'sisterhood', and then we ended up with many feminisms, if you like. The black struggle became more diversified once the basic issues were established. And blackness here is not to do with the colour of your skin but a political stance."

Exhibitions
Since 1983, Mona Hatoum has been displaying both her installations and her video performance art pieces in exhibitions around the world. She has been featured in individual exhibitions as recently as 2018 at White Cube in Hong Kong.

Some of her other solo exhibitions of note include: Centre Pompidou, Paris (1994), Museum of Contemporary Art, Chicago (1997), The New Museum of Contemporary Art, New York (1998), Castello di Rivoli, Turin (1999), Tate Britain, London (2000), Hamburger Kunsthalle, Kunstmuseum Bonn, Magasin 3, Stockholm (2004) and Museum of Contemporary Art, Sydney (2005), Parasol Unit, London (2008), Darat Al Funun, Jordan (2008), Fondazione Querini Stampalia, Venice (2009), Beirut Art Center (2010), and the Menil Collection (2017).

She has also participated in a number of recognized group exhibitions, including: The Turner Prize (1995), Venice Biennale (1995 and 2005), Biennale of Sydney (2006) and the Biennale of Montreal; Drone the automated image (2013). A solo exhibition entitled Turbulence is organized in 2014 by Mathaf Arab Museum of Modern Art in Doha.

Hatoum's work was featured in a solo exhibition at the Institute of Contemporary Art, Boston in 2015.

In May 2016, Tate Modern held a "comprehensive exploration into 35 years of Hatoum's work in Britain, from her early performance and video works to her sculpture and large-scale installation"

The Menil Collection in Houston, Texas organized a solo exhibition titled "Mona Hatoum: Terra Infirma" that was on view from 12 October 2017 to 25 February 2018. This exhibition then traveled to the Pulitzer Arts Foundation and was on view from 6 April to 11 August 2018.

In March 2018, Hatoum was shortlisted for the Hepworth Prize for Sculpture, alongside Michael Dean, Phillip Lai, Magali Reus and Cerith Wyn Evans. The work of the shortlisted artists was displayed at the Hepworth Wakefield gallery from the end of October of that year.

In January 2020, Hatoum was part of Artpace’s exhibit titled Visibilities: Intrepid Women of Artpace. Also in 2020, she received the Julio González award, featuring in a solo exhibition at Institut Valencià d'Art Modern in 2021.

Solo Exhibitions

2021 "Mona Hatoum", IVAM Institut Valenciá d'Art Modern, Valencia 

2019 Remains to be Seen, White Cube, London

2019 Galerie Chantal Crousel, Paris

2018 Remains of the Day, White Cube, Hong Kong

2018 Every wall a door, Riverrun, Istanbul

2017 The 10th Hiroshima Art Prize, Hiroshima City Museum of Contemporary Art

2017 Terra Infirma, Menil Collection, Houston, Texas

2017 Terra Infirma, Pulitzer Arts Foundation, St. Louis, Missouri, 2018

2017 Displacements/Entortungen: Ayşe Erkmen & Mona Hatoum, Museum der bildenden Künste, Leipzig, Germany

2016 Twelve Windows, Tate Modern, London

2016 Twelve Windows, Kiasma Museum of Contemporary Art, Helsinki, 2016

2014 Turbulence, Mathaf: Arab Museum of Modern Art, Doha, Qatar

2014 Twelve Windows, Alexander and Bonin, New York

2014 Galerie René Blouin, Montreal

2014 Close Quarters, Museum of Fine Arts Ghent, Belgium

2014 Pinacoteca do Estado de São Paulo

2013 Mappings, Centre d’art des Pénitents Noirs, Aubagne, France

2013 A Body of Work, Galleria Continua, San Gimignano, Italy

2013 Kunstmuseum St. Gallen, Switzerland

2013 Reflection, Galerie Chantal Crousel, Paris

2012 You Are Still Here, Arter, Istanbul

2012 Projection, Joan Miró Prize, Fundació Joan Miró, Barcelona

2012 Shift, Galerie Max Hetzler, Berlin

2011 Silver Lining, Hochschule der Künste, Bern, Switzerland

2011 Bunker, White Cube, London

2011 Bourj, Alexander and Bonin, New York

2011 Sammlung Goetz, Munich

2010 Galerie Chantal Crousel, Paris

2010 Suspendu, MAC/VAL Musée d’art contemporain du Val–de–Marne, Vitry–sur–Seine, France

2010 Witness, Beirut Art Center

2010 Käthe – Kollwitz Prize 2010, Akademie der Künste, Berlin

2010 Electrified, Kunsthal 44 Møen, Askeby, Sweden

2010 Le Grand Monde, Fundación Botín, Santander, Spain

2010 Keeping It Real: Act 3, Current Disturbance, Whitechapel Gallery, London

2009 Alexander and Bonin, New York

2009 Measures of Entanglement, Ullens Center for Contemporary Art, Beijing

2009 Hanging Garden, Kunsthalle Wien, Vienna

2009 Interior Landscape, Fondazione Querini Stampalia, Venice

2009 Undercurrent (red), Galleria Continua, San Gimignano, Italy

2009 Natura Morta, Fondazione Merz, Turin, Italy

2009 Mona Hatoum: Collected Works, Rennie Collection at Wing Sang, Vancouver

2008 Galerie Chantal Crousel, Paris

2008 Undercurrents, XIII Biennale Donna, Palazzo Massari PAC, Ferrara, Italy

2008 Unhomely, Galerie Max Hetzler, Berlin

2008 Hanging Garden, DAAD Galerie, Berlin

2008 Present Tense, Parasol Unit, London

2008 Darat al Funun – The Khalid Shoman Foundation, Amman, Jordan

2006 Kairotic, Townhouse Gallery, Cairo

2006 Galerie Max Hetzler, Berlin

2006 Galleria Continua, San Gimignano, Italy

2006 Hot Spot, White Cube, London

2005 Over My Dead Body, Museum of Contemporary Art Australia, Sydney

2005 Mobile Home, Alexander and Bonin, New York

2005 Douglas F. Cooley Memorial Art Gallery, Reed College, Portland, Oregon

2004 Hamburger Kunsthalle, Germany; Kunstmuseum Bonn, Germany; Magasin III, Stockholm

2004 Galerie René Blouin, Montreal

2003 Photo and Video Works, Uppsala Konstmuseum, Sweden

2003 Artist’s Choice: Mona Hatoum, Here Is Elsewhere, Museum of Modern Art, New York

2003 Museo de Arte Contemporáneo de Oaxaca

2003 Exconvento de Conkal, Yucatan, Mexico

2002 Laboratorio Arte Alameda, Mexico City

2002 Grater Divide, White Cube, London

2002 Centro de Arte de Salamanca

2002 Centro Galego de Arte Contemporánea, Santiago de Compostela, Spain

2002 Alexander and Bonin, New York

2002 Galerie Nordenhake, Stockholm

2001 Sala Mendoza, Caracas

2000 The Entire World as a Foreign Land, Tate Britain, London

2000 Images from Elsewhere, fig–1, London

2000 SITE Santa Fe, New Mexico; as Domestic Disturbance, Massachusetts Museum of Contemporary Art, North Adams, 2001

1999 The Box, Turin, Italy

1999 Castello di Rivoli, Turin, Italy

1999 Artpace, San Antonio, Texas

1999 Le Creux de l’enfer – Centre d’art contemporain, Thiers, France; Le Collège, FRAC

1999 Fonds régional d’art contemporain Champagne–Ardenne, Reims, France, 2000

1999 Museum van Hedendaagse Kunst Antwerpen, Antwerp, Belgium, 2000

1999 Alexander and Bonin, New York

1998 Kunsthalle Basel

1998 Measures of Distance, Contemporary Arts Center, Cincinnati, Ohio

1998 Over My Dead Body, Der Standard, Museum in Progress, Vienna

1998 Museum of Modern Art, Oxford, UK

1998 Scottish National Gallery of Modern Art, Edinburgh

1997 Museum of Contemporary Art, Chicago

1997 New Museum of Contemporary Art, New York

1997 Galerie René Blouin, Montreal

1996 The Fabric Workshop and Museum, Philadelphia

1996 Gallery Anadiel, Jerusalem

1996 Current Disturbance, Capp Street Project, San Francisco

1996 Quarters, Viafarini, Milan

1996 De Appel, Amsterdam

1995 Socle du Monde, White Cube, London

1995 Short Space, Galerie Chantal Crousel, Paris

1995 British School at Rome

1994 Mona Hatoum, Centre Georges Pompidou, Paris

1994 Galerie René Blouin, Montreal

1994 Centre Georges Pompidou, Paris

1994 CRG Gallery, New York

1993 Mona Hatoum, Arnolfini, Bristol

1993 Recent Work, Arnolfini, Bristol, UK

1993 South London Gallery (with Andrea Fisher), London

1993 Socle du monde, Galerie Chantal Crousel, Paris

1993 Positionings/Transpositions (with Barbara Steinman), Art Gallery of Ontario, Toronto, Canada

1992 Mario Flecha Gallery, London

1992 Dissected Space: New Installations 1990–1992, Chapter Arts Centre, Cardiff

1992 Dissected Space, Chapter, Cardiff, UK

1989 Mind the Gap, A Space, Toronto, Canada (performance)

1989 The Light at the End, The Showroom, London; Oboro, Montreal

1989 Galerie Obscure, Quebec

1989 Forest City Gallery, London, Canada

1986 Nine One One Contemporary Arts Center, Seattle, Washington

1985 Between the Lines, The Orchard Gallery, Derry, UK (performance)

1985 Variation on Discord and Divisions, Western Front, Vancouver; Articule, Montreal (performance)

1984 Variation on Discord and Divisions, ABC No Rio, New York (performance)

1984 Variation on Discord and Divisions, AKA Gallery, Saskatoon, Canada (performance)

1984 The Negotiating Table, Franklin Furnace, New York (performance)

1983 The Negotiating Table, SAW Gallery, Ottawa, Canada (performance)

1983 The Negotiating Table, Niagara Artists Centre, St Catharines (performance)

1983 The Negotiating Table, Western Front, Vancouver (performance)

Awards
 2008 – Rolf Schock Prize in Visual Arts
 2011 – Joan Miró Prize, Fundació Joan Miró
 2017 – 10th Hiroshima Art Prize, Hiroshima City Museum of Contemporary Art, Hiroshima
 2018 – Whitechapel Gallery Art Icon
 2019 – Praemium Imperiale for the sculpture category, in recognition of her lifetime achievement in the medium.
 2021 – Julio González Price 2020

See also
 Palestinian art

References

Further reading
 Michael Archer, Guy Brett, and Catherine M. De Zegher, eds., Mona Hatoum, Phaidon, Oxford, 1997
 Catherine de Zegher. Women's work is never done: an anthology. AsaMER, Gent, 2014

External links

 Mona Hatoum at Whitecube.com
 Mona Hatoum at Female-artists.net
 Mona Hatoum at daratalfunun.org
 Mona Hatoum at for-site.org
 Mona Hatoum Artist CV at Whitecube.com
 

Palestinian video artists
Feminist artists
Lebanese artists
Living people
1952 births
Artists from Beirut
Alumni of the Slade School of Fine Art
Alumni of the Byam Shaw School of Art
Members of the Academy of Arts, Berlin
Lebanese people of Palestinian descent
Palestinian women artists
Palestinian contemporary artists
Lebanese women artists
20th-century women artists